Len Tolhurst (7 July 1926 – 21 July 2011) was an Australian sports shooter. He competed in the 50 metre pistol event at the 1956 Summer Olympics.

References

1926 births
2011 deaths
Australian male sport shooters
Olympic shooters of Australia
Shooters at the 1956 Summer Olympics
Place of birth missing